Sankt Eriksplan is a square in the district of Vasastaden in Stockholm, Sweden.

History
Saint Erik's Plaza was called so after King Erik IX who is the patron saint of Stockholm and depicted in the city's coat of arms.

Sankt Eriksplan metro station was opened in 1952 and is on the green line between Odenplan and Fridhemsplan.
Popular venues close to Sankt  Eriksplan include Filadelfiakyrkan ('the Philadelphia Church') which offers frequent concerts.  Nearby is the riverside park of Karlberg Palace which was built in 1630. It is in sight of the Military Academy Karlberg which was inaugurated in 1792. Sankt Eriksplan is a popular and expensive residential area, with apartment prices being among the most expensive in Stockholm.

In 2017, Low Roar released a song named after the metro station, "St. Eriksplan".

References

Squares in Stockholm
Odonyms referring to religion